Boa Viagem can mean:

 The Portuguese language greeting for good travel, equivalent to French Bon voyage
 Boa Viagem, Recife, a beach and neighborhood in the city of Recife, Brazil
 Boa Viagem, Niterói, a beach and neighborhood in the city of Niterói, Brazil
 Boa Viagem, Ceará, a municipality in the state of Ceará, Brazil
 Boa Viagem Esporte Clube, an association football club based in Boa Viagem, Ceará